Miramare railway station is a railway station in Miramare, a suburb of Trieste, in the autonomous region of Friuli Venezia Giulia, northeastern Italy. The station was constructed in 1857 on a line which at the time connected Vienna with Trieste, mainly to serve the Miramare Castle. The station building is intact but it is closed, and only local trains to Udine stop at the station.

Train services
The station is served by the following services:

Regional services (Treno regionale) Venice - Treviso - Udine - Gorizia - Trieste
Regional services (Treno regionale) Tarvisio - Carnia - Gemona del Friuli - Udine - Cervignano del Friuli - Trieste

References

Buildings and structures in the Province of Trieste
Railway stations in Friuli-Venezia Giulia
Railway stations opened in 1860